Evel Knievel (1938–2007) was a stunt performer.

Evel Knievel may also refer to:

Evel Knievel (1971 film), a film starring George Hamilton
Evel Knievel (2004 film), a television film directed by John Badham
Evel Knievel (roller coaster), a wooden roller coaster at Six Flags St. Louis
Evel Knievel (video game), a video game published by Rockstar Games